Bubbleville was a series of early-season college basketball showcases held at the Mohegan Sun resort in Uncasville, Connecticut, during the opening months of the 2020–21 NCAA Division I men's and women's basketball seasons. Organized by Gazelle Group and the Naismith Memorial Basketball Hall of Fame, the series featured a number of events normally hosted by the bodies, moved to a bubble due to the COVID-19 pandemic in the United States.

There were 46 games scheduled, but only 26 were played, leaving 20 games canceled due to COVID-19 issues.

Tournaments relocated to Bubbleville
 Empire Classic
 Legends Classic
 Hall of Fame Tip Off
 HomeLight Classic
 Basketball Hall of Fame Women's Challenge
 Women's Jimmy V Classic

Notable games
 San Francisco upset #4 Virginia 61–60 on November 27, 2020 (HomeLight Classic)
 Virginia Tech beat #3 Villanova 81–73 on November 28, 2020 (Air Force Reserve Hall of Fame Tip-Off)
 UConn outlasts USC 61–58 on December 3, 2020 (Roman Legends Classic)

References

College men's basketball competitions in the United States
Basketball in Connecticut